Rikke Iversen (born  in Oslo) is a Norwegian wheelchair curler.

She participated at the 2018 Winter Paralympics where Norwegian team won a silver medal.

Teams

References

External links 

 
 
 

Living people
1998 births
Norwegian female curlers
Sportspeople from Oslo
Norwegian wheelchair curlers
Paralympic wheelchair curlers of Norway
Paralympic medalists in wheelchair curling
Paralympic silver medalists for Norway
Wheelchair curlers at the 2018 Winter Paralympics
Medalists at the 2018 Winter Paralympics
World wheelchair curling champions